I'm from Missouri is a 1939 American comedy film directed by Theodore Reed and written by Duke Atteberry and Jack Moffitt. The film stars Bob Burns, Gladys George, Gene Lockhart, Judith Barrett, William "Bill" Henry and Patricia Morison. The film was released on April 7, 1939, by Paramount Pictures.

It is based on novels "Sixteen Hands" by Homer Croy (1938) and "Need of Change" by Julian Street(1909).

Plot
Sweeney Bliss raises prize-winning mules in Missouri. He travels to London with a twofold purpose, to sell mules to the government there and to find a fitting husband for daughter Julie Bliss, perhaps a British dignitary or someone equally suitable.

Complications set in when rival Porgie Rowe also arrives from Missouri, persuading the government that his tractors would be of more use to them than Sweeney's mules.

Cast 
Bob Burns as Sweeney Bliss
Gladys George as Julie Bliss
Gene Lockhart as Porgie Rowe
Judith Barrett as Lola Pike
William "Bill" Henry as Joel Streight
Patricia Morison as Mrs. Allison 'Rowe' Hamilton
E. E. Clive as Mr. Arthur	
Melville Cooper as Hearne
William Collier, Sr. as Smith
Lawrence Grossmith as Colonel Marchbank
G.P. Huntley as Captain Brooks-Bowen
Doris Lloyd as Mrs. Arthur
Tom Dugan as Gus
Dennie Moore as Kitty Hearne
James Burke as Walt Bliss
Ethel Griffies as Miss Wildhack
Spencer Charters as Charley Shook
Raymond Hatton as Darryl Coffee
Charles Halton as Henry Couch

Reception

Frank Nugent of The New York Times said, "The too-long absence from our cinematic midst of that genial and characteristically asymmetrical map of the Southwest Territory, the physiognomy of Bob Burns, is sensibly and, in a few low-comedy high spots, inspiredly repaired by I'm From Missouri, at the Paramount. A pleasant variation on the commonplace folksiness-vs.-social-ambition theme, carried this time to the length of finally involving half the British peerage in a riotous Missouri hoe-down, the picture is a hare-brained and occasionally hilarious example of a type of Western which we can only classify as mule opera. It is also —need we emphasize? —one of the funniest of this year's crop of comedies."

References

External links 
 

1939 films
Paramount Pictures films
American comedy films
1939 comedy films
Films directed by Theodore Reed
American black-and-white films
1930s English-language films
1930s American films